In Greek mythology, Asaeus (Ancient Greek: Ἀσαῖον) was an Achaean warrior who was slayed in the Trojan War by the hero Hector, son of King Priam and Queen Hecuba of Troy.

Note

References 

 Homer, The Iliad with an English Translation by A.T. Murray, Ph.D. in two volumes. Cambridge, MA., Harvard University Press; London, William Heinemann, Ltd. 1924. . Online version at the Perseus Digital Library.
 Homer, Homeri Opera in five volumes. Oxford, Oxford University Press. 1920. . Greek text available at the Perseus Digital Library.

Achaeans (Homer)